Caitlin & Will were an American country music duo, consisting of members Caitlin Lynn and Will Snyder, that rose to fame when they won season one of CMT's Can You Duet. After winning, they signed with Columbia Nashville. They initially intended to release a song titled "Even Now" as their debut single, but the label decided to release "Address in the Stars" instead. The song was released to radio on March 30, 2009 and peaked at No. 42. Their debut album went unreleased, and the duo disbanded in October 2009.

History
Caitlin Lynn was born in Glen Burnie, Maryland, while Will Snyder was born in London, Kentucky. The two had originally auditioned for Can You Duet with different partners, but were put together by executives of the show.

After winning the competition, they were signed to Columbia Records' Nashville division and started work on recording their debut album. While originally their debut single was to be "Even Now", after a string of radio tours, the label decided to change the single to "Address in the Stars", which peaked at number 42 on Hot Country Songs. The song peaked at No. 42 on Hot Country Songs in June 2009. They made their Grand Ole Opry debut on May 22, 2009.

On March 31, 2009, they released a six song digital EP, entitled Caitlin & Will - EP, which was produced by songwriter Chris Lindsey. The EP debuted and peaked on both the Billboard Top Country Albums and Top Heatseekers charts at No. 51 and No. 46, respectively. The album included "Address in the Stars" and five other songs, which would have been included on their debut album Dark Horse. It was announced on October 1, 2009 that Caitlin & Will had parted ways with Columbia Records Nashville. Thus, Dark Horse went unreleased, and it was announced that the duo had split.

Discography

Extended plays

Singles

Music videos

References

Country music duos
Country music groups from Tennessee
Columbia Records artists
Musical groups established in 2008
Musical groups disestablished in 2009
Musical groups from Nashville, Tennessee
2008 establishments in Tennessee